Mian Muhammad Farooq is a Pakistani politician who had been a member of the National Assembly of Pakistan, from June 2013 to May 2018.

Political career
He was elected to the National Assembly of Pakistan as a candidate of Pakistan Muslim League (N) from Constituency NA-80 (Faisalabad-VI) in 2013 Pakistani general election. He received 96,039 votes and Rana Asif Tauseef, a candidate of Pakistan Muslim League (Q).

References

Living people
Pakistan Muslim League (N) MNAs
Punjabi people
Pakistani MNAs 2013–2018
Politicians from Faisalabad
Year of birth missing (living people)